Pristimantis subsigillatus is a species of frog in the family Strabomantidae. It is found in the lowlands in south-western Colombia (western flank of the Colombian Massif) and western Ecuador (west of the Andes) up to elevations of  asl. It is sometimes known as Salidero robber frog (after its type locality) or engraved rainfrog.

Description
Skin of dorsum is smooth or very finely shagreened. Colour varies from pale green to light reddish brown. Ventral surfaces are white to pale yellow with brown flecks.

Habitat and conservation
Pristimantis subsigillatus is an arboreal frog found in tropical moist lowland forests, often near streams and rivers. It is usually encountered at night on medium to high bushes and in arboreal bromeliads. During the day, it shelters in bromeliad axils.

While locally common, the arboreal lifestyle (up to 10 meters above ground) of this frog makes it difficult to find. It may be more easily heard than seen. The call is a single, sharp, explosive "tweet".

Pristimantis subsigillatus is potentially threatened by habitat loss and pollution.

References

subsigillatus
Amphibians of Colombia
Amphibians of Ecuador
Amphibians described in 1902
Taxonomy articles created by Polbot